P. A. Amoj Jacob (born 2 May 1998) is an Indian sprinter who specializes in the 400 metres and the 800 metres.

In July 2017, Jacob was part of India's gold medal winning 4 × 400 metres relay team at the Asian Athletics Championships. The team of Jacob, Kunhu Muhammed, Arokia Rajiv and Mohammad Anas clocked 3:02.92, the season best time in Asia, to give India its first gold at the event since Seoul 1975. With this performance, the team entered the Athletics World Championships in August 2017 with the sixth best timing in the world. He competed in the 2020 Tokyo Olympics in the Men's 4x400 m relay event where the Indian team broke the Asian and National Records and clocked a time of 3:00.25.

In 2021, Jacob won the gold medal in the 400 metres event at the 2021 Federation Cup Senior Athletics Championships.

References

External links
 

1998 births
Living people
Indian male sprinters
Athletes from Delhi
Athletes (track and field) at the 2018 Commonwealth Games
Commonwealth Games competitors for India
Athletes (track and field) at the 2020 Summer Olympics
Olympic athletes of India
Athletes (track and field) at the 2022 Commonwealth Games